Andreyevka is a rural locality (a selo) and the administrative center of Andreyevsky Selsoviet of Ivanovsky District, Amur Oblast, Russia. The population was 238 as of 2018. There are 4 streets.

Geography 
Andreyevka is located on the left bank of the Manchzhurka River, 22 km southeast of Ivanovka (the district's administrative centre) by road. Pravovostochnoye is the nearest rural locality.

References 

Rural localities in Ivanovsky District, Amur Oblast